Hypomolis viridis is a moth of the family Erebidae. It was described by Herbert Druce in 1903. It is found in Peru.

References

 

Arctiini
Moths described in 1903